True Blood is an American television drama series created and produced by Alan Ball. It is based on The Southern Vampire Mysteries by Charlaine Harris.

This article includes main characters (i.e. characters played by a main cast member), as well as every recurring vampire, and every other character to appear in at least four episodes.

Main characters

Humans

Supernaturals

Seasonal antagonists

Past main characters

Additional characters

Supporting vampire characters

Additional characters, introduced in season 1

Additional characters, introduced in season 2

Additional characters, introduced in season 3

Additional characters, introduced in season 4

Additional characters, introduced in season 5

See also 
 List of The Southern Vampire Mysteries characters

References

External links 

 True Blood Official site
 

True Blood
True Blood
True Blood